Pseudopolynesia is a genus of moths in the family Geometridae.

Species
Pseudopolynesia amplificata (Walker, 1861)
Pseudopolynesia hebe (Bethune-Baker, 1915)

References

External links
Natural History Museum Lepidoptera genus database

Eupitheciini